"Avenues and Alleyways" is a 1973 single recorded by Tony Christie as the theme song for the television series The Protectors (1972 - 1974). It was written and produced by Mitch Murray and Peter Callander, who were also responsible for Christie's "Las Vegas" and "I Did What I Did for Maria". The song initially appears on the album With Loving Feeling, released in 1972. Following the chart-topping success of the re-release of "(Is This the Way to) Amarillo" in 2005, this song was also re-released and peaked at No. 26 on the UK Singles Chart. On its original release, it had only reached No. 37. It is included in the soundtrack of the 2000 film Love, Honour and Obey, starring Ray Winstone and Jude Law.

Cover versions
A cover version of "Avenues and Alleyways", made by British punk band G.B.H., appears on their 1987 album No Need to Panic.

References

1973 singles
2005 singles
Tony Christie songs
Songs written by Mitch Murray
Songs written by Peter Callander
Schlager songs
1972 songs